Francis Figuereo (born 29 May 1970) is a Dominican Republic judoka. He competed in the men's half-lightweight event at the 1996 Summer Olympics.

References

1970 births
Living people
Dominican Republic male judoka
Olympic judoka of the Dominican Republic
Judoka at the 1996 Summer Olympics
Place of birth missing (living people)